n-Butylbenzene is the organic compound with the formula C6H5C4H9.  Of two isomers of butylbenzene, n-butylbenzene consists of a phenyl group attached to the 1 position of a butyl group.  It is a slightly greasy, colorless liquid.  

The synthesis of n-butylbenzene by the reaction of chlorobenzene and butylmagnesium bromide was one of the first demonstrations of the Kumada coupling using nickel diphosphine catalysts.  This mild and efficient process contrasted with older methods.

See also
 C4-Benzenes

References

Alkylbenzenes
C4-Benzenes
Butyl compounds